Ancient Near East Monographs is an open-access monograph series focused on the Ancient Near East, including ancient Israel and its literature, from the early Neolithic to the early Hellenistic eras. It is published jointly by the Society of Biblical Literature and the Center of Studies of Ancient Near Eastern History (CEHAO).

Editors 
 Ehud Ben Zvi, Roxana Flammini (2008-2015)
 Alan Lenzi (2016-2018) & Jeffrey Stackert (since 2018), Juan Manuel Tebes (since 2016)

See also 
 Journal of Biblical Literature
 Review of Biblical Literature
 Antiguo Oriente

External links 
 
ETANA Electronic Tools and Ancient Near East Archives
AWOL The Ancient World Online
 NSD - Norwegian Centre for Research Data
 BINPAR Bibliografía Nacional de Publicaciones Periódicas Argentinas Registradas

Ancient Near East journals
Monographic series
Series of books
Publications established in 2008
English-language journals